Odulemma is a village in Saue Parish, Harju County in northern Estonia. Prior to the administrative reform of Estonian local governments in 2017, the village belonged to Nissi Parish.

References

Villages in Harju County